Aleksander Kwiek (born January 13, 1983) is a Polish footballer who plays as a midfielder for Widzew Łódź.

Club career
Born in Wodzisław Śląski, Kwiek started his career with Rymer Niedobczyce. In 2000, he moved to Odra Wodzisław Śląski where he was a key player. In 2004, he joined Wisła Kraków where he won league title, but he did not become a regular player so in 2005 he moved to Korona Kielce, where he stayed for two seasons. In 2006, he signed for Górnik Łęczna. Upon the expiry of his Górnik contract in 2007 he joined for one season to Jagiellonia Białystok. In 2008, he rejoined to Korona Kielce.

Honours
 Wisła Kraków
 Polish Champion: 2004–05

References

External links
 

1983 births
Living people
People from Wodzisław Śląski
Sportspeople from Silesian Voivodeship
Association football midfielders
Polish footballers
Ekstraklasa players
Odra Wodzisław Śląski players
Wisła Kraków players
Korona Kielce players
Górnik Łęczna players
Jagiellonia Białystok players
Górnik Zabrze players
Zagłębie Lubin players